Lisa B. Subeck (born June 17, 1971) is an American political organizer and Democratic politician.  She is a member of the Wisconsin State Assembly, representing the west side of Madison, Wisconsin, since January 2015.

Early life and career
Born in Chicago, Illinois, Subeck graduated from Rich Central High School in Olympia Fields, Illinois. She went on to earn her bachelor's degree in Psychology from the University of Wisconsin–Madison in 1993.

Subeck began her career after college working on programs for children and young mothers.  She became a Dane County program director for the Head Start and Early Head Start programs, and helped launch Hope House, a Madison-based housing program for young mothers of infants and toddlers.  In 1998, she also began teaching early education courses at Madison Area Technical College, and, in 2003, became a program coordinator for the  Madison YWCA.

Political career
Her work on social programs assisting families and children led her into policy advocacy.  In 2005, she made her first attempt for elected office, running as a Progressive Dane candidate for Madison Common Council.  She was defeated by Jed Sanborn, who was one of a number of Democratic Party candidates backed by a coalition of realty and development interests.

She continued her involvement in local affairs, and was a member of Madison's Community Services Committee, Equal Opportunities Commission, and Madison's Southwest Neighborhood Plan Committee.  In 2009, she was hired as Executive Director for NARAL Pro-Choice Wisconsin, and, in 2011, she made another attempt for election to City Council.  This time, she was supported by the Democratic Party of Wisconsin.  She topped a field of five candidates in the nonpartisan primary, and went on to win 58% of the vote against her general election opponent, who identified as a fiscally-conservative moderate.

City council
In 2011, Subeck and fellow Alder Matthew Phair introduced a series of budget amendments to address crime, gang and drug violence in the Southwest section of Madison. The budget amendments included $30,000 for police overtime as part of a community safety initiative, $900,000 for the purchase and rehabilitation of a vacant restaurant building for a community center, funding for a spray park, and $60,000 for an additional building inspector to work in deteriorating neighborhoods. A majority of the items were passed in the 2012 budget. A spray park opened at Elver Park in 2014, and after two years of negotiations, the city of Madison purchased the former Griff's Restaurant and, in 2019, opened the center, now known as the Southwest Madison Employment Center.

In January 2012, Subeck joined five other alders in calling for fellow Alder Solomon to resign over allegations he sexually harassed and assaulted an assistant city clerk in January 2012. After a lengthy investigation the city’s civil rights office found no proof that Solomon had sexually harassed the assistant city clerk and determined not to press charges. Solomon did not resign from office, but did not run for another term in 2013.

In 2013, Subeck worked with the Mayor to lead an effort to pass new campaign finance disclosure rules that exceed what is required by state law, requiring corporations and other entities making independent expenditures to disclose not only their campaign spending but also their donors who contributed to expenditures for or against a candidate in a city election.

State government
Subsequent to her election to the City Council, Subeck became involved in the project to recall Governor Scott Walker, and, in 2012, she was hired as Executive Director of United Wisconsin, an independent political action committee organized to facilitate that recall.  Though the recall was unsuccessful, she continued to run United Wisconsin through the 2014 election.

In 2014, she announced a campaign for Wisconsin State Assembly in the 78th Assembly district.  The 78th district was an open seat, as the incumbent, Brett Hulsey, chose to run instead for Governor of Wisconsin.  In the Democratic primary, she defeated fellow city councilmember Mark Clear with 56% of the vote.  She was unopposed in the 2014 general election, and was sworn in January 2015.

Subeck was subsequently reelected in 2016, 2018, and 2020.

In the Legislature, Subeck has been elected minority caucus vice-chair for the 2021–2022 session.  She currently serves on the Assembly committees for Review of Administrative Rules, on Campaigns and Elections, on Energy and Utilities, on Health, and on Rules, and serves on the Joint Committee for Review of Administrative Rules.

In addition to her service in the Legislature, Subeck serves as the Wisconsin director of the National Foundation for Women Legislators, and is an executive board member of the Women's Legislative Network of the National Conference of State Legislatures.

Elections

Madison City Council (2005) 

| colspan="6" style="text-align:center;background-color: #e9e9e9;"| General Election, April 8, 2005

Madison City Council (2011, 2013) 

| colspan="6" style="text-align:center;background-color: #e9e9e9;"| Nonpartisan Primary, February 17, 2011

| colspan="6" style="text-align:center;background-color: #e9e9e9;"| General Election, April 5, 2011

| colspan="6" style="text-align:center;background-color: #e9e9e9;"| General Election, April 2, 2013

Wisconsin State Assembly (2014–present)

References

External links
 Representative Lisa Subeck at Wisconsin Legislature
 
 

 

1971 births
Living people
Women state legislators in Wisconsin
Democratic Party members of the Wisconsin State Assembly
Wisconsin city council members
Politicians from Chicago
Politicians from Madison, Wisconsin
University of Wisconsin–Madison College of Letters and Science alumni
Women city councillors in Wisconsin
21st-century American politicians
21st-century American women politicians